Agra is a city in Phillips County, Kansas, United States.  As of the 2020 census, the population of the city was 208.

History
Agra was first settled in 1888, and incorporated in 1904. Agra was a station on the Chicago, Rock Island and Pacific Railroad. It was named for Agra in India.

Geography
Agra is located at  (39.760686, -99.119592).

Demographics

2010 census
As of the census of 2010, there were 267 people, 116 households, and 78 families residing in the city. The racial makeup of the city was 95.1% White, 0.4% African American, 1.9% Native American, 0.4% Asian, and 2.2% from two or more races. Hispanic or Latino of any race were 2.2% of the population.

There were 116 households, of which 25.0% had children under the age of 18 living with them, 56.0% were married couples living together, 6.0% had a female householder with no husband present, 5.2% had a male householder with no wife present, and 32.8% were non-families. 30.2% of all households were made up of individuals, and 13.8% had someone living alone who was 65 years of age or older. The average household size was 2.30 and the average family size was 2.86.

The median age in the city was 49.4 years. 23.2% of residents were under the age of 18; 6.4% were between the ages of 18 and 24; 14.6% were from 25 to 44; 36.7% were from 45 to 64; and 19.1% were 65 years of age or older. The gender makeup of the city was 51.3% male and 48.7% female.

2000 census
As of the census of 2000, there were 306 people, 131 households, and 89 families residing in the city. The racial makeup of the city was 98.69% White, 0.33% Native American, and 0.98% from two or more races. Hispanic or Latino of any race were 0.65% of the population.

There were 131 households, out of which 31.3% had children under the age of 18 living with them, 56.5% were married couples living together, 9.9% had a female householder with no husband present, and 31.3% were non-families. 29.8% of all households were made up of individuals, and 14.5% had someone living alone who was 65 years of age or older. The average household size was 2.34 and the average family size was 2.89.

In the city, the population was spread out, with 28.4% under the age of 18, 3.9% from 18 to 24, 24.5% from 25 to 44, 26.5% from 45 to 64, and 16.7% who were 65 years of age or older. The median age was 39 years. For every 100 females, there were 91.3 males. For every 100 females age 18 and over, there were 90.4 males.

The median income for a household in the city was $27,250, and the median income for a family was $36,250. Males had a median income of $26,944 versus $16,429 for females. The per capita income for the city was $16,960. About 8.5% of families and 10.7% of the population were below the poverty line, including 11.3% of those under the age of eighteen and 7.7% of those 65 or over.

Education
The community is served by Thunder Ridge USD 110 public school district, where schools are located in Kensington and Agra. In 2008 West Smith County USD 238 and Eastern Heights USD 324 combined to form Thunder Ridge USD 110. The Thunder Ridge High School mascot is the Thunder Ridge Longhorns.

Agra schools were closed through school unification. The Agra High School mascot was Agra Purple Chargers.

References

Further reading

External links

 Agra - Directory of Public Officials
 Agra city map, KDOT

Cities in Kansas
Cities in Phillips County, Kansas
1888 establishments in Kansas
Populated places established in 1888